Gulworthy is a hamlet and civil parish in Devon, England that adjoins the border with Cornwall. There are a group of buildings by the road junction Gulworthy Cross which constitute the centre of the parish. These are Gulworthy School, St Paul's Church and the Parish Hall. In 2011 the parish had a population of 518. However it is part of the electoral ward of Tamarside, the population of Tamarside at the 2011 census was 1,622.

History 
The parish was formed on 1 April 1987 from Tavistock Hamlets.

References

External links
 Official website of Gulworthy Parish Hall

Villages in the Borough of West Devon